Orlando Bueso (born May 13, 1974 in Atlántida) is a Honduran football player who last played for Miami FC in the USL First Division.

Career

College and amateur
Bueso grew up in Hialeah, Florida, and played college soccer at the Lindsey Wilson College. He is the only player in Lindsey Wilson history to be a four-time first-team All-American and, in 1998, became the first Blue Raider to be named NAIA National Player of the Year. He is the school's all-time leader in points (208) and assists (48), ranks second in goals scored (80), and helped lead the Blue Raiders to an 84-13-5 record during his career, including three NAIA national championships. He was voted to Lindsey Wilson's Athletic Hall of Fame in 2004.

Professional
Bueso was drafted in the first round of the 1999 A-League draft by Richmond Kickers, and played for them for several years before disappearing to the amateur ranks in the mid-2000s.

After playing with the amateur Honduras Five Star (Honduras Cinco Estrellas) in the Copa Latina qualification tournament for the 2008 US Open Cup, Bueso signed with Miami FC of the USL First Division on April 13, 2009. He scored one goal in 15 games that season.

References

External links
 Miami FC bio

1974 births
Living people
People from Atlántida Department
Association football midfielders
Honduran footballers
Miami FC (2006) players
Richmond Kickers players
Lindsey Wilson Blue Raiders men's soccer players
People from Hialeah, Florida
Honduran emigrants to the United States